Roman Kenk (November 25, 1898 – October 2, 1988) was a Slovenian, later American, zoologist.

Life
Roman Kenk received his PhD degree in zoology at the University of Graz, Austria, in 1921, and worked at the University of Ljubljana.

From 1931–1932, and again in the summer of 1933, Kenk stayed at the University of Virginia, USA, where he met Ada Antonio Blanco, who had come from Puerto Rico. They married in 1933 and returned to Ljubljana, where they stayed for 5 years and then moved to Puerto Rico. Four years later, in 1942, Kenk became a naturalized American citizen.

From 1948 to 1965, Kenk was employed at the Library of Congress. Later, he became a research associate at the Department of Invertebrate Zoology of the Smithsonian Institution, Washington, D. C., where he worked until his death in 1988.

Kenk's life was dedicated to the study of freshwater planarians, especially from Europe and the United States.

Taxa named in his honor
Several taxa were named after Roman Kenk, such as the freshwater planarian genera Kenkia and Romankenkius.

References

1898 births
1988 deaths
Slovenian zoologists
Yugoslav zoologists
Slovenian emigrants to the United States
20th-century American zoologists
University of Graz alumni
Library of Congress
Smithsonian Institution people
Scientists from Ljubljana
Helminthologists